Margaret M. Wiecek (also known as Małgorzata M. Więcek) is a Polish-American operations researcher and professor of mathematical sciences at Clemson University, known for her research in multi-objective optimization, Pareto efficiency, robust design, and three-dimensional packing problems in mechanical engineering.

Wiecek earned her Ph.D. from the Akademia Górniczo-Hutnicza in Kraków, Poland, in 1984, under the supervision of Henryk Górecki. She joined the Clemson faculty in 1988.

Wiecek was president of the INFORMS section on Multiple Criteria Decision Making for 2016–2017. In 2019, the International Society on Multiple Criteria Decision Making gave Wiecek their highest award, the Multiple Criteria Decision Making Gold Medal.

References

External links

Year of birth missing (living people)
Living people
20th-century American mathematicians
21st-century American mathematicians
American women mathematicians
Polish mathematicians
Operations researchers
Clemson University faculty
20th-century American women
AGH University of Science and Technology alumni
21st-century American women